Shawn Mauer is an American cinematographer best known for films including Bring It On.

Filmography

References

External links
 

American cinematographers
Living people
Year of birth missing (living people)